The Missouri Public Service Commission regulates investor-owned telephone, electric, natural gas, steam, water, and sewer utilities in the state of Missouri.  Manufacturers and retail dealers who sell new and used manufactured homes and modular units are also regulated by the commission.

The PSC is composed of five commissioners, who are appointed by the Governor of Missouri. The current commissioners, as of 2021, are Chairman Ryan Silvey, Scott T. Rupp, Maida J. Coleman, Jason Holsman and Glen Kolkmeyer.

External links
Official Website for the Missouri Public Service Commission.
Publications by or about the Missouri Public Service Commission at Internet Archive.

Missouri
State agencies of Missouri